The 1958–59 British National League season was the fifth season of the British National League. Four teams participated in the league, and the Paisley Pirates won the championship.

British National League

Regular season

Autumn Cup

Results

References

External links
 Nottingham Panthers history site

British
1958–59 in British ice hockey
1958 in English sport
1959 in English sport
1958 in Scottish sport
1959 in Scottish sport